NIMH may refer to:

Nickel–metal hydride battery (NiMH), a type of electrical battery
National Institute of Mental Health, an agency of the United States government
National Institute of Medical Herbalists, a professional organisation in the United Kingdom
Rats of NIMH, a series of children's books
The Secret of NIMH, a 1982 animated film
The Secret of NIMH 2: Timmy to the Rescue, a 1998 direct-to-video animated film